Cerro Verde is a Peru-based mining company. Its activities include the extraction, exploitation and production of copper from the porphyry copper deposit located southeast of the city of Arequipa. In addition, the company holds a copper sale agreement with Sumitomo Metal Mining, as well as a molybdenum sale contract with Climax Molybdenum Company.

Cerro Verde project is undergoing a major expansion in order to increase its concentrator facilities to 360,000 metric tons-per-day (mtd). Fluor Corporation is in charge of the construction management services for said expansion.

Montgomery Watson y Harza (MWH) and Alto Cayma consortium supervised the construction. They have together constructed the La Tomilla II drinking water plant, a social responsibility project through which potable water for residents of Arequipa in Perú is being produced and delivered.

References 

Companies of Peru